USS Mercer may refer to the following ships operated by the United States Navy:

 , was acquired by the US Navy 16 January 1919 and decommissioned 26 May 1919
 , is a barracks craft commissioned 19 September 1945 and currently in active service

United States Navy ship names